The Stranglers and Friends: Live in Concert is a live album by English rock band the Stranglers, released in 1995 by Receiver Records. In 2002, the album was re-released on the Castle Music label, digitally remastered from the original master tapes with new artwork and sleeve notes.

Background
In the spring of 1980, guitarist and singer Hugh Cornwell was in Pentonville Prison for drugs possession. With two gigs scheduled at the London Rainbow for 3 April and 4 April, the management decided to turn things around by approaching a number of artists (including Robert Fripp, John Ellis, Toyah Willcox, Peter Hammill and Hazel O'Connor, among others) to fill in for the absent Cornwell. The Stranglers and Friends: Live in Concert chronicles this event. At the time, it was planned to release a live album of the concerts, with all the proceeds going to the drug rehabilitation organisation Cure. The album never materialised as the band nearly went bankrupt shortly after the concerts, and it was forgotten about.

Track listing

A 1997 release of this recording by Hallmark Records contains the same tracks (not in the same order), except "(Get A) Grip (On Yourself)", "Hanging Around", "Bear Cage" and "Peaches".

Personnel
Credits adapted from the album liner notes.

The Stranglers
Jean-Jacques Burnel – bass, vocals
Dave Greenfield – keyboards
Jet Black – drums
Friends
John Ellis – guitar on all tracks
Steve Nisbett – rhythmic drum patterns
Robert Smith – guitar on 2, 3
Robert Fripp – guitar on 4-6
Basil Gabbidon – guitar on 7, 9
Wilko Johnson – guitar on 8, 10
John Turnbull – guitar on 11, 12
Larry Wallis – guitar on 15
Steve Hillage – guitar on 16, 17
Matthieu Hartley – keyboards on 12
Nik Turner – saxophone on 9
Davey Payne – saxophone on 11, 12
Hazel O'Connor – vocals on 2, 3
Peter Hammill – vocals on 4, 7
Phil Daniels – vocals on 6, 8
Nicky Tesco – vocals on 9 
Richard Jobson – vocals on 10, 14, 15
Toyah Willcox – vocals on 13, 16, backing vocals on 11, 12
Ian Dury – vocals on 11, 12
Jake Burns – vocals on 17
Technical
Mark Brennan – sleeve notes
Robert Fairclough – sleeve notes, design, picture research (2002 reissue) 
Giovanni Scatola – remastering (2002 reissue)

References

1995 live albums
The Stranglers live albums